Serdar Denktaş is son of Rauf Denktaş, the former President of the de facto Turkish Republic of Northern Cyprus.

He was the Minister of Finance of Northern Cyprus from April 2016 to May 2019. His previous portfolios include Labour, Settlement, Foreign Affairs, Economy, Tourism, Sports, Interior, Rural Affairs, Environment, State, Youth, National Education and Culture. He was also an acting Prime Minister from 23 April 2005 to 26 April 2005.

Currently he is the leader of the Democratic Party.  He is viewed as a more pragmatic politician in the Cyprus problem than his father.

He was born in Nicosia in 1959. After completing a course in printing at the London College of Printing in the United Kingdom, he entered University College, Cardiff, to study Economics. However, he did not succeed in completing his studies and returned to Cyprus. He served as the General Manager of the Credit Bank of Cyprus.

In the 1990 General Elections he was elected to the TRNC Parliament as a National Unity Party MP for Nicosia, and served as the Minister of the Interior, Rural Affairs and Environment. He resigned from the NUP in 1992 and took part in the formation of the Democratic Party.

In the 1993 General Elections he was re-elected to his seat as a Democratic Party MP. He served in that government as the Minister of Youth and Sports. He became the leader of the Democratic Party in 1996. He served briefly as Minister of State and Deputy Prime Minister until the formation of a new coalition government.

He was re-elected to the TRNC Parliament at the 1998 General Elections. In 1991, he was appointed Minister of Tourism and Environment. At the general elections in 2003, he was re-elected and appointed as the Deputy Prime Minister and Minister of Foreign Affairs until September 2006, when the Democratic Party was dropped as a coalition partner by the Republican Turkish Party.

He was appointed Deputy Prime Minister and Minister of Finance on 16 April 2016. His term as Deputy Prime Minister ended 2 February 2018. He resigned as Minister of Finance on 8 May 2019.

He speaks Turkish and English.

Political titles
Serdar Denktaş is known for serving under a large number of titles throughout his political career. The following table lists his governmental and legislative titles.

References

External links
TRNC Deputy Prime Ministry and Ministry of Foreign Affairs

1959 births
Living people
21st-century prime ministers of Northern Cyprus
People from North Nicosia
National Unity Party (Northern Cyprus) politicians
Democratic Party (Northern Cyprus) politicians
Prime Ministers of Northern Cyprus
Finance ministers of Northern Cyprus
Foreign ministers of Northern Cyprus
Government ministers of Northern Cyprus
Members of the Assembly of the Republic (Northern Cyprus)
Leaders of political parties in Northern Cyprus
Children of national leaders
Türk Maarif Koleji alumni